The biblical Magi ( or ;)—also referred to as the (Three) Wise Men, (Three) Kings, and the (Three) Magi—were distinguished foreigners in the Gospel of Matthew and Christian tradition. They are said to have visited Jesus after his birth, bearing gifts of gold, frankincense and myrrh. They are regular figures in traditional accounts of the nativity celebrations of Christmas and are an important part of Christian tradition.

The Gospel of Matthew is the only one of the four canonical gospels to mention the Magi.  has it that they came "from the east" to worship the "king of the Jews". The gospel never mentions the number of Magi. Still, most western Christian denominations have traditionally assumed them to have been three in number, based on the statement that they brought three gifts. In Eastern Christianity, especially the Syriac churches, the Magi often number twelve. Their identification as kings in later Christian writings is probably linked to Isaiah , which refers to "kings [coming] to the brightness of your dawn" bearing "gold and frankincense". Further identification of the magi with kings may be due to Psalm 72:11, "May all kings fall down before him".

Biblical account

Traditional nativity scenes depict three "Wise Men" visiting the infant Jesus on the night of his birth, in a manger accompanied by the shepherds and angels, but this should be understood as an artistic convention allowing the two separate scenes of the Adoration of the Shepherds on the birth night and the later Adoration of the Magi to be combined for convenience. The single biblical account in  simply presents an event at an unspecified point after Christ's birth in which an unnumbered party of unnamed "wise men" visits him in a house, not a stable. The New Revised Standard Version of Matthew 2:1–12 describes the visit of the Magi in this manner:

The text specifies no interval between the birth and the visit, and artistic depictions and the closeness of the traditional dates of December 25 and January 6 encourage the popular assumption that the visit took place the same winter as the birth, but later traditions varied, with the visit taken as occurring up to two winters later. This maximum interval explained Herod's command at Matthew 2:16–18 that the Massacre of the Innocents included boys up to two years old. Some more recent commentators, not tied to the traditional feast days, suggest a variety of intervals.

The wise men are mentioned twice shortly thereafter in verse 16, in reference to their avoidance of Herod after seeing Jesus, and what Herod had learned from their earlier meeting. The star which they followed has traditionally become known as the Star of Bethlehem.

Description

The Magi are popularly referred to as wise men and kings. The word  is the plural of Latin , borrowed from Greek , as used in the original Greek text of the Gospel of Matthew. Greek  itself is derived from Old Persian maguŝ from the Avestan magâunô, i.e., the religious caste into which Zoroaster was born (see Yasna 33.7: "ýâ sruyê parê magâunô" = "so I can be heard beyond Magi"). The term refers to the Persian priestly caste of Zoroastrianism. As part of their religion, these priests paid particular attention to the stars and gained an international reputation for astrology, which was at that time highly regarded as a science. Their religious practices and use of astrology caused derivatives of the term Magi to be applied to the occult in general and led to the English term magic. The King James Version translates the term as wise men; the same translation is applied to the wise men led by Daniel of earlier Hebrew Scriptures. Several translations refer to the men outright as astrologers at Matthew Chapter 2, including New English Bible (1961); Phillips New Testament in Modern English (J.B.Phillips, 1972); Twentieth Century New Testament (1904 revised edition); Amplified Bible (1958-New Testament); An American Translation (1935, Goodspeed); and The Living Bible (K. Taylor, 1962-New Testament).

Although the Magi are commonly referred to as "kings", there is nothing in the account from the Gospel of Matthew that implies that they were rulers of any kind. Early readers reinterpreted Matthew in light of these prophecies and elevated the Magi to kings. By AD 500 all commentators adopted the prevalent tradition that they were kings. Later Christian interpretation stressed the adoration of the Magi and shepherds as the first recognition by the people of the earth of Christ as the Redeemer, but the reformer John Calvin was vehemently opposed to referring to the Magi as kings. He wrote: "But the most ridiculous contrivance of the Papists on this subject is, that those men were kings... Beyond all doubt, they have been stupefied by a righteous judgment of God, that all might laugh at [their] gross ignorance."

Names

The New Testament does not give the names of the Magi. However, traditions and legends identify a variety of different names for them. In the Western Christian church, they have all been regarded as saints and are commonly known as:

 Melchior (also Melichior), a Persian scholar;

The online version of Encyclopædia Britannica states: "According to Western church tradition, Balthasar is often represented as a king of Arabia or sometimes Ethiopia, Melchior as a king of Persia, and Gaspar as a king of India." These names apparently derive from a Greek manuscript probably composed in Alexandria around 500, which has been translated into Latin with the title Excerpta Latina Barbari. Another Greek document from the 8th century, of presumed Irish origin and translated into Latin with the title Collectanea et Flores, continues the tradition of three kings and their names and gives additional details.

One candidate for the origin of the name Caspar appears in the Acts of Thomas as Gondophares (21 – c. AD 47), i.e., Gudapharasa (from which "Caspar" might derive as corruption of "Gaspar"). This Gondophares declared independence from the Arsacids to become the first Indo-Parthian king, and he was allegedly visited by Thomas the Apostle. According to Ernst Herzfeld, his name is perpetuated in the name of the Afghan city Kandahar, which he is said to have founded under the name Gundopharron.

In contrast, many Syrian Christians name the Magi Larvandad, Gushnasaph, and Hormisdas.

In the Eastern churches, Ethiopian Christianity, for instance, has Hor, Karsudan, and Basanater, while the Armenian Catholics have Kagpha, Badadakharida and Badadilma.
Many Chinese Christians believe that one of the magi came from China.

Country of origin and journey
The phrase "from the east", more literally "from the rising [of the sun]", is the only information Matthew provides about the region from which they came. The Parthian Empire, centered in Persia, stretched from eastern Syria to the fringes of India. Though the empire was tolerant of other religions, its dominant religion was Zoroastrianism, with its priestly magos class.

Although Matthew's account does not explicitly cite the motivation for their journey (other than seeing the star in the east, which they took to be the star of the King of the Jews), the Syriac Infancy Gospel provides some clarity by stating explicitly in the third chapter that they were pursuing a prophecy from their prophet, Zoradascht (Zoroaster).

There is an Armenian tradition identifying the "Magi of Bethlehem" as Balthasar of Arabia, Melchior of Persia, and Caspar of India. Historian John of Hildesheim relates a tradition in the ancient silk road city of Taxila (in present-day Punjab, Pakistan) that one of the Magi passed through the city on the way to Bethlehem.

Sebastian Brock, a historian of Christianity, has said: "It was no doubt among converts from Zoroastrianism that... certain legends were developed around the Magi of the Gospels". And Anders Hultgård concluded that the Gospel story of the Magi was influenced by an Iranian legend concerning magi and a star, which was connected with Persian beliefs in the rise of a star predicting the birth of a ruler and with myths describing the manifestation of a divine figure in fire and light.

A model for the homage of the Magi might have been provided, it has been suggested, by the journey to Rome of King Tiridates I of Armenia, with his magi, to pay homage to the Emperor Nero, which took place in AD 66, a few years before the date assigned to the composition of the Gospel of Matthew.

There was a tradition that the Central Asian Naimans and their Christian relatives, the Keraites, were descended from the biblical Magi. This heritage passed to the Mongol dynasty of Genghis Khan when Sorghaghtani, niece of the Keraite ruler Toghrul, married Tolui, the youngest son of Genghis, and became the mother of Möngke Khan and his younger brother and successor, Kublai Khan. Toghrul became identified with the legendary Central Asian Christian king Prester John, whose Mongol descendants were sought as allies against the Muslims by contemporary European monarchs and popes. Sempad the Constable, elder brother of King Hetoum I of Cilician Armenia, visited the Mongol court in Karakorum in 1247–1250 and in 1254. He wrote a letter to Henry I King of Cyprus and Queen Stephanie (Sempad's sister) from Samarkand in 1243, in which he said: "Tanchat [Tangut, or Western Xia], which is the land from whence came the Three Kings to Bethlehem to worship the Lord Jesus which was born. And know that the power of Christ has been, and is, so great, that the people of that land are Christians; and the whole land of Chata [Khitai, or Kara-Khitai] believes those Three Kings. I have myself been in their churches and have seen pictures of Jesus Christ and the Three Kings, one offering gold, the second frankincense, and the third myrrh. And it is through those Three Kings that they believe in Christ, and that the Chan and his people have now become Christians. The legendary Christian ruler of Central Asia Prester John was reportedly a descendant of one of the Magi.

In her four volumes of visions of the life of Christ, Anne Catherine Emmerich says that the Magi came from the border between Chaldea and Elam, mentioning Ur, "Mozian" (Iraq's Maysan Province, anciently known as Mesene), "Sikdor" (Shushtar, near Susa), and a "city, whose name sounded to me something like Acajaja" (Aghajari), as well as other cities farther east.

Gestures of respect

The Magi are described as "falling down", "kneeling" or "bowing" in the worship of Jesus. This gesture, together with Luke's birth narrative, had an important effect on Christian religious practices. They were indicative of great respect, and typically used when venerating a king. While prostration is now rarely practised in the West it is still relatively common in the Eastern Churches, especially during Lent. Kneeling has remained an important element of Christian worship to this day.

Traditional identities and symbolism
Apart from their names, the three Magi developed distinct characteristics in Christian tradition, so that between them they represented the three ages of (adult) man, three geographical and cultural areas, and sometimes other things. In one tradition, reflected in art by the 14th century (for example in the Arena Chapel by Giotto in 1305) Caspar is old, normally with a white beard, and gives the gold; he is "King of Tarsus, land of merchants" on the Mediterranean coast of modern Turkey, and is first in line to kneel to Christ. Melchior is middle-aged, giving frankincense from Arabia, and Balthazar is a young man, very often and increasingly black-skinned, with myrrh from Saba (modern southern Yemen). Their ages were often given as 60, 40 and 20 respectively, and their geographical origins were rather variable, with Balthazar increasingly coming from Aksum or other parts of Africa, and being represented accordingly. Balthazar's blackness has been the subject of considerable recent scholarly attention; in art, it is found mostly in northern Europe, beginning from the 12th century, and becoming very common in the north by the 15th. The subject of which king is which and who brought which gift is not without some variation depending on the tradition. The gift of gold is sometimes associated with Melchior as well and in some traditions, Melchior is the old man of the three Magi.

Gifts

Three gifts are explicitly identified in Matthew: gold, frankincense and myrrh. Many different theories of the meaning and symbolism of the gifts have been brought forward. While gold is fairly obviously explained, frankincense, and particularly myrrh, are more obscure. See the previous section for who gave which.

The theories generally break down into two groups:
All three gifts are ordinary offerings and gifts given to a king. Myrrh being commonly used as an anointing oil, frankincense as a perfume, and gold as a valuable.
The three gifts had a spiritual meaning: gold as a symbol of kingship on earth, frankincense (an incense) as a symbol of deity, and myrrh (an embalming oil) as a symbol of death.
This dates back to Origen in Contra Celsum: "gold, as to a king; myrrh, as to one who was mortal; and incense, as to a God."
These interpretations are alluded to in the verses of the popular carol "We Three Kings" in which the magi describe their gifts. The last verse includes a summary of the interpretation: "Glorious now behold Him arise/King and God and sacrifice."
Sometimes this is described more generally as gold symbolizing virtue, frankincense symbolizing prayer, and myrrh symbolizing suffering.

Myrrh was used as an embalming ointment and as a penitential incense in funerals and cremations until the 15th century. The "holy oil" traditionally used by the Eastern Orthodox Church for performing the sacraments of chrismation and unction is traditionally scented with myrrh, and receiving either of these sacraments is commonly referred to as "receiving the myrrh". The picture of the Magi on the 7th-century Franks Casket shows the third visitor – he who brings myrrh – with a valknut over his back, a pagan symbol referring to Death.

It has been suggested by scholars that the "gifts" were medicinal rather than precious material for tribute.

The Syrian King Seleucus I Nicator is recorded to have offered gold, frankincense and myrrh (among other items) to Apollo in his temple at Didyma near Miletus in 288/7 BC, and this may have been the precedent for the mention of these three gifts in Gospel of Matthew (2:11). It was these three gifts, it is thought, which were the chief cause for the number of the Magi becoming fixed eventually at three.

This episode can be linked to Isaiah 60 and to Psalm 72, which report gifts being given by kings, and this has played a central role in the perception of the Magi as kings, rather than as astronomer-priests. In a hymn of the late 4th-century Hispanic poet Prudentius, the three gifts have already gained their medieval interpretation as prophetic emblems of Jesus' identity, familiar in the carol "We Three Kings" by John Henry Hopkins, Jr., 1857.

John Chrysostom suggested that the gifts were fit to be given not just to a king but to God, and contrasted them with the Jews' traditional offerings of sheep and calves, and accordingly Chrysostom asserts that the Magi worshiped Jesus as God.

What subsequently happened to these gifts is never mentioned in the scripture, but several traditions have developed. One story has the gold being stolen by the two thieves who were later crucified alongside Jesus. Another tale has it being entrusted to and then misappropriated by Judas. One tradition suggests that Joseph and Mary used the gold to finance their travels when they fled Bethlehem after an angel had warned, in a dream, about King Herod's plan to kill Jesus. And another story proposes the theory that the myrrh given to them at Jesus' birth was used to anoint Jesus' body after his crucifixion.

There was a 15th-century golden case purportedly containing the Gift of the Magi housed in the Monastery of St. Paul of Mount Athos. It was donated to the monastery in the 15th century by Mara Branković, daughter of the King of Serbia Đurađ Branković, wife to the Ottoman Sultan Murat II and godmother to Mehmet II the Conqueror (of Constantinople). After the Athens earthquake of September 7, 1999, they were temporarily displayed in Athens to strengthen faith and raise money for earthquake victims. The relics were displayed in Ukraine and Belarus in Christmas of 2014, and thus left Greece for the first time since the 15th century.

Martyrdom traditions

Christian Scriptures record nothing about the biblical Magi after reporting their going back to their own country (Matthew 2:12 uses the feminine singular noun, χώραν, noting one country, territory or region of origin). Two separate traditions have surfaced claiming that they were so moved by their encounter with Jesus that they either became Christians on their own or were quick to convert fully upon later encountering an Apostle of Jesus. The traditions claim that they were so strong in their beliefs that they willingly embraced martyrdom.

Chronicon of Dexter
One tradition gained popularity in Spain during the 17th century; it was found in a work called the Chronicon of Dexter. The work was ascribed to Flavius Lucius Dexter the bishop of Barcelona, under Theodosius the Great. The tradition appears in the form of a simple martyrology reading, "In Arabia Felix, in the city of Sessania of the Adrumeti, the martyrdom of the holy kings, the three Magi, Gaspar, Balthassar, and Melchior who adored Christ." First appearing in 1610, the Chronicon of Dexter was immensely popular along with the traditions it contained throughout the 17th century. Later, this was all brought into question when historians and the Catholic hierarchy in Rome declared the work a pious forgery.

Relics at Cologne
A competing tradition asserts that the biblical Magi "were martyred for the faith, and that their bodies were first venerated at Constantinople; thence they were transferred to Milan in 344. It is certain that when Frederick I, Holy Roman Emperor (Barbarossa) imposed his authority on Milan, the relics there were transferred to Cologne Cathedral, housed in the Shrine of the Three Kings, and are venerated there today." The Milanese treated the fragments of masonry from their now-empty tomb as secondary relics and these were widely distributed around the region, including southern France, accounting for the frequency with which the Magi appear on chasse reliquaries in Limoges enamel.

Tombs
There are several traditions on where the remains of the Magi are located, although none of the traditions is considered as an established fact or even as particularly likely by secular history. Marco Polo claimed that he was shown the three tombs of the Magi at Saveh south of Tehran in the 1270s:

Paul William Roberts provides some modern-day corroboration of this possibility in his book Journey of the Magi.

A Shrine of the Three Kings at Cologne Cathedral, according to tradition, contains the bones of the Three Wise Men. Reputedly they were first discovered by Helena of Constantinople on her famous pilgrimage to Palestine and the Holy Lands. She took the remains to the church of Hagia Sophia in Constantinople; they were later moved to Milan (some sources say by the city's bishop, Eustorgius I), before being sent to their current resting place by the Holy Roman Emperor Frederick I in 1164. The Milanese celebrate their part in the tradition by holding a medieval costume parade every 6 January.

A version of the detailed elaboration familiar to us is laid out by the 14th-century cleric John of Hildesheim's Historia Trium Regum ("History of the Three Kings"). In accounting for the presence in Cologne of their mummified relics, he begins with the journey of Helena, the mother of Constantine I to Jerusalem, where she recovered the True Cross and other relics:

Queen Helen… began to think greatly of the bodies of these three kings, and she arrayed herself, and accompanied by many attendants, went into the Land of Ind… after she had found the bodies of Melchior, Balthazar, and Gaspar, Queen Helen put them into one chest and ornamented it with great riches, and she brought them into Constantinople... and laid them in a church that is called Saint Sophia.

Religious significance
The visit of the Magi is commemorated in most Western Christian churches by the observance of Epiphany, 6 January, which also serves as the feast of the three as saints. The Eastern Orthodox celebrate the visit of the Magi on 25 December.

The Quran does not contain Matthew's episode of the Magi. However, the Persian Muslim encyclopaedist al-Tabari, writing in the 9th century, gives the familiar symbolism of the gifts of the Magi. Al-Tabari gave his source for the information to be the later 7th century Perso-Yemenite writer Wahb ibn Munabbih.

Traditions

Holidays celebrating the arrival of the Magi traditionally recognise a distinction between the date of their arrival and the date of Jesus' birth. The account given in the Gospel of Matthew does not state that they were present on the night of the birth; in the Gospel of Luke, Joseph and Mary remain in Bethlehem until it is time for Jesus' dedication, in Jerusalem, and then return to their home in Nazareth.

Hispanic customs

Western Christianity celebrates the Magi on the day of Epiphany, January 6, the day immediately following the twelve days of Christmas, particularly in the Spanish-speaking parts of the world. In these areas, the Three Kings (or simply ) receive letters from children and so bring them gifts on the night before Epiphany. In Spain, each one of the Magi is supposed to represent one different continent, Europe (Melchior), Asia (Caspar) and Africa (Balthasar). According to the tradition, the Magi come from the Orient on their camels to visit the houses of all the children, much like Sinterklaas and Santa Claus with his reindeer elsewhere, they visit everyone in one night. In some areas, children prepare a drink for each of the Magi. It is also traditional to prepare food and drink for the camels, because this is the only night of the year when they eat.

In Spain, Argentina, Mexico, Paraguay and Uruguay, there is a long tradition of having the children receive presents by the three "Reyes Magos" on the night of January 5 (Epiphany Eve) or morning of January 6. Almost every Spanish city or town organises cabalgatas in the evening, in which the kings and their servants parade and throw sweets to the children (and parents) in attendance. The cavalcade of the three kings in Alcoy claims to be the oldest in the world, having started in 1886. The Mystery Play of the Three Magic Kings is also presented on Epiphany Eve. There is also a "Roscón" (Spain) or "Rosca de Reyes" (Mexico) as explained below.

In the Philippines, beliefs concerning the Three Kings (Filipino: Tatlóng Haring Mago, lit. "Three Magi Kings"; shortened to Tatlóng Harì or Spanish Tres Reyes) follows Hispanic influence, with the Feast of the Epiphany considered by many Filipinos as the traditional end of their Christmas season. The tradition of the Three Kings' cabalgata is today done only in some areas, such as the old city of Intramuros in Manila, and the island of Marinduque. Another dying custom is children leaving shoes out on Epiphany Eve, so that they may receive sweets and money from the Three Kings. With the arrival of American culture in the early 20th century, the Three Kings as gift-givers have been largely replaced in urban areas by Santa Claus, and they only survive in the greeting "Happy Three Kings!" and the surname Tatlóngharì. The Three Kings are especially revered in Gapan, Nueva Ecija, where they are enshrined as patron saints in the National Shrine of Virgen La Divina Pastora.

In most of these countries, children cut grass or greenery on January 5 and put it in a box under their bed or besides the christmas tree for the Kings' camels. Children receive gifts on January 6, which is called Día de Reyes, and is traditionally the day in which the Magi arrived bearing gifts for the Christ child. Christmas starts in December and ends in January after Epiphany, although in Puerto Rico there are eight more days of celebration (las octavitas).

In 2009 a campaign started in Spain over the fact that Balthazar is commonly played by a white person in blackface.

Central Europe

A tradition in Poland, the Czech Republic, Slovakia, Slovenia, and German-speaking Catholic areas is the writing of the three kings' initials (C+M+B, C M B, G+M+B, K+M+B, in those areas where Caspar is spelled Kaspar or Gašper) above the main door of Catholic homes in chalk. This is a new year's blessing for the occupants and the initials also are believed to also stand for "Christus mansionem benedicat" ("May/Let Christ Bless This House"). Depending on the city or town, this will be happen sometime between Christmas and the Epiphany, with most municipalities celebrating closer to the Epiphany. The  carry a star representing the one followed by the biblical magi and sing Christmas carols as they go door to door, such as "Stern über Bethlehem". After singing, the children write the three kings' initials on the door frame in exchange for charitable donations. Each year, German and Austrian dioceses pick one charity towards which all  donations nationwide will be contributed. Traditionally, one child in the  group is said to represent Baltasar from Africa and so, that child typically wears blackface makeup. Many Germans do not consider this to be racist because it is not intended to be a negative portrayal of a black person, but rather, a "realistic" or "traditional" portrayal of one. The dialogue surrounding the politics of traditions involving blackface is not as developed as in Spain or the Netherlands. In the past, photographs of German politicians together with children in blackface have caused a stir in English-language press. Moreover, Afro-Germans have written that this use of blackface is a missed opportunity to be truly inclusive of Afro-Germans in German-speaking communities and contribute to the equation of "blackness" with "foreignness" and "otherness" in German culture.

In 2010 the day of Epiphany, January 6, was made a holiday in Poland and thus a pre-war tradition was revived. Since 2011, celebrations with biblical costuming have taken place throughout the country. For example, in Warsaw there are processions from Plac Zamkowy down Krakowskie Przedmieście to Plac Piłsudskiego.

Cake

In Spain and Portugal, a ring-shaped cake contains both a small figurine of one of the Magi (or another surprise depending on the region) and a dry broad bean. The one who gets the figurine is "crowned" (with a crown made of cardboard or paper), but whoever gets the bean has to pay the value of the cake to the person who originally bought it. In Mexico they also have the same ring-shaped cake Rosca de Reyes (Kings Bagel or Thread) with figurines inside it. Whoever gets a figurine is supposed to organize and be the host of the family celebration for the Candelaria feast on February 2.

In France and Belgium, a cake containing a small figure of the baby Jesus, known as the "broad bean", is shared within the family. Whoever gets the bean is crowned king for the remainder of the holiday and wears a cardboard crown purchased with the cake. A similar practice is common in many areas of Switzerland, but the figurine is a miniature king. A queen is sometimes also chosen.

In New Orleans, Louisiana, parts of southern Texas, and surrounding regions, a similar ring-shaped cake known as a "King Cake" traditionally becomes available in bakeries from Epiphany to Mardi Gras. The baby Jesus figurine is inserted into the cake from underneath, and the person who gets the slice with the figurine is expected to buy or bake the next King Cake. There is wide variation among the types of pastry that may be called a King Cake, but most are a baked cinnamon-flavoured twisted dough with thin frosting and additional sugar on top in the traditional Mardi Gras colours of gold, green and purple. To prevent accidental injury or choking, the baby Jesus figurine is frequently not inserted into the cake at the bakery, but included in the packaging for optional use by the buyer to insert it themselves. Mardi Gras-style beads and doubloons may be included as well.

In art

The Magi most frequently appear in European art in the Adoration of the Magi; less often in the Journey of the Magi has been a popular subject in art, and topos, and other scenes such as the Magi before Herod and the Dream of the Magi also appear in the Middle Ages. In Byzantine art they are depicted as Persians, wearing trousers and phrygian caps. Crowns appear from the 10th century. Despite being saints, they are very often shown without halos, perhaps to avoid distracting attention from either their crowns or the halos of the Holy Family. Sometimes only the lead king, kneeling to Christ, has a halo the two others lack, probably indicating that the two behind had not yet performed the act of worship that would ensure their status as saints. Medieval artists also allegorised the theme to represent the three ages of man. Beginning in the 12th century, and very often by the 15th, the Kings also represent the three parts of the known (pre-Columbian) world in Western art, especially in Northern Europe. Balthasar is thus represented as a young African or Moor, and Caspar may be depicted with distinctly Oriental features.

An early Anglo-Saxon depiction survives on the Franks Casket (early 7th century, whalebone carving), the only Christian scene, which is combined with pagan and classical imagery. In its composition it follows the oriental style, which renders a courtly scene, with the Virgin and Christ facing the spectator, while the Magi devoutly approach from the (left) side. Even amongst non-Christians who had heard of the Christian story of the Magi, the motif was quite popular, since the Magi had endured a long journey and were generous. Instead of an angel, the picture places a swan-like bird, perhaps interpretable as the hero's fylgja (a protecting spirit, and shapeshifter).

Austrian artist Gottfried Helnwein depicted a more controversial tableau in his painting, Epiphany I: Adoration of the Magi (1996). Intended to represent the "many connections between the Third Reich and the Christian churches in Austria and Germany", Nazi officers in uniform stand around an Aryan Madonna. The Christ toddler who stands on Mary's lap resembles Adolf Hitler.

More generally they appear in popular Nativity scenes and other Christmas decorations that have their origins in the Neapolitan variety of the Italian  or Nativity crèche.

In music
Some Christmas carols refer to the biblical Magi or Three Kings, especially hymns meant to be sung by the star singers, such as "Stern über Bethlehem". Peter Cornelius composed a song cycle, Weihnachtslieder, Op. 8, which contain the song "Die Könige" (The Kings), which became popular in an English choral arrangement, "The Three Kings". Balthazar, Caspar, and Melchior are also featured in Gian Carlo Menotti's 1951 opera Amahl and the Night Visitors. The popular carol "We Three Kings" is another example. Johann Sebastian Bach's Cantata #65 "Sie werden aus Saba alle kommen" ("All they from Saba shall come") also tells about the Wise Men, based on the Old Testament prophesy found in Isaiah 60:6 ("A multitude of camels shall cover you, the young camels of Midian and Ephah; all those from Sheba shall come.  They shall bring gold and frankincense, and shall proclaim the praise of the Lord.")

In literature

The story "The Other Wise Man" by Henry van Dyke tells the story of a fourth wise man who set out but never arrived because he was delayed by a mission of kindness.

The poem Journey of the Magi by T.S. Eliot is from the point of view of an aged king.

The first part of Lewis Wallace's 1880 novel Ben-Hur tells the story of the birth of Christ from Balthasar's point of view. Here Balthasar comes from Egypt and is joined by Melchior, a Hindu, and Gaspar, a Greek. Balthasar remains a recurring character throughout the novel.

See also

 Astronomy
 Christian views on astrology
 List of names for the biblical nameless
 Mystery play
 Patron saint archive
 Saint Caspar
 Saint Nicholas

References
Notes

Citations

Bibliography
Giffords, Gloria Fraser, Sanctuaries of Earth, Stone, and Light: The Churches of Northern New Spain, 1530–1821, 2007, University of Arizona Press, 9780816525898, google books
Metzger, Bruce, New Testament Studies: Philological, Versional, and Patristic, Volume 10, 1980, BRILL, 9789004061637.
Penny, Nicholas, National Gallery Catalogues (new series): The Sixteenth Century Italian Paintings, Volume II, Venice 1540–1600, 2008, National Gallery Publications Ltd, 
Schiller, Gertud, Iconography of Christian Art, Vol. I, 1971 (English trans from German), Lund Humphries, London,

Further reading
Albright, W. F., and C. S. Mann. "Matthew." The Anchor Bible Series. New York: Doubleday & Company, 1971.

 Becker, Alfred: Franks Casket. Zu den Bildern und Inschriften des Runenkästchens von Auzon (Regensburg, 1973) pp. 125–142, Ikonographie der Magierbilder, Inschriften.

Brown, Raymond E. The Birth of the Messiah: A Commentary on the Infancy Narratives in Matthew and Luke. London: G. Chapman, 1977.
Clarke, Howard W. (2003). The Gospel of Matthew and its Readers: A Historical Introduction to the First Gospel. Bloomington: Indiana University Press.

Eric Vanden Eykel The Magi: Who They Were, How They’ve Been Remembered, and Why They Still Fascinate Fortress Press, 2022.
France, R. T. The Gospel According to Matthew: An Introduction and Commentary. Leicester: Inter-Varsity, 1985.
Gundry, Robert H. Matthew: A Commentary on his Literary and Theological Art. Grand Rapids: William B. Eerdmans Publishing Company, 1982.

Hill, David. The Gospel of Matthew. Grand Rapids: Eerdmans, 1981
 Lambert, John Chisholm, A Dictionary of Christ and the Gospels. Page 97–101.
Levine, Amy-Jill. "Matthew." Women's Bible Commentary. Carol A. Newsom and Sharon H. Ringe, eds. Louisville: Westminster John Knox Press, 1998.
 Molnar, Michael R., The Star of Bethlehem: The Legacy of the Magi. Rutgers University Press, 1999. 187 pages. 
Powell, Mark Allan. "The Magi as Wise Men: Re-examining a Basic Supposition." New Testament Studies. Vol. 46, 2000.
Schweizer, Eduard. The Good News According to Matthew. Atlanta: John Knox Press, 1975.
 Trexler, Richard C. Journey of the Magi: Meanings in History of a Christian Story. Princeton University Press, 1997.
 Watson, Richard, A Biblical and Theological Dictionary, Page 608–611.

External links

Mark Rose, "The Three Kings & the Star": the Cologne reliquary and the BBC popular documentary
Caroline Stone, "We Three Kings of Orient Were"
"Procession of the Three Kings in Valencia"

 
Ancient astrologers

Groups of Roman Catholic saints
Matthew 2
Zoroastrian priests
Unnamed people of the Bible
Christmas gift-bringers
Magi
Myrrh